"30th Anniversary" is a 3-CD box set by Spanish duo Baccara, released by Sony-BMG Germany on 31 August 2007.

With a few minor omissions this fifty-track compilation comprises the entire recorded output of the original formation of the duo, Mayte Mateos and Maria Mendiola, made between the years 1977 and 1981 for the RCA-Victor label; their four studio albums Baccara (1977), Light My Fire (1978), Colours (1979), Bad Boys (1981), non-album tracks like "The Devil Sent You To Lorado", "Somewhere In Paradise", "Sleepy Time Toy", "Candido" as well as Spanish-, French- and German-language versions of some of their hits. 16 of the 50 tracks were previously unreleased on CD.

Track listing

Personnel
 Mayte Mateos - vocals
 María Mendiola - vocals

Production
Disc 1 - All tracks arranged and produced by Rolf Soja
Disc 2 - All tracks arranged and produced by Rolf Soja
Disc 3 - Tracks 1-6: arranged and produced by Rolf Soja, tracks 7-16: arranged by Bruce Baxter and produced by Graham Sacher

Sources and external links
 allmusic.com entry
 discogs.com entry
 rateyourmusic.com entry

Baccara albums
2007 compilation albums